Addison Taylor Smith (September 5, 1862 – July 5, 1956) was a congressman from Idaho. Smith served as a Republican in the U.S. House for ten terms, from 1913 to 1933.

Born in Cambridge, Ohio, Smith began his political career in 1891 in Washington, D.C. as a secretary for Republican U.S. Senator George L. Shoup of Idaho. He graduated from George Washington University Law School in 1895 and served on Shoup's staff until the senator's 1900 election defeat. In 1903 Smith joined the staff of U.S. Senator Weldon B. Heyburn, another Idaho Republican. Smith also served as secretary of the Idaho Republican Party.

By 1905 Smith established a residence in Idaho at Twin Falls. He was appointed as registrar of the United States Land Office in Boise in 1907.

Congress
In 1912, Idaho added a second seat in the U.S. House, and Smith was elected as one of two at-large members from Idaho, representing the entire state. Beginning with the 1918 election, the state was separated into two districts and he represented the 2nd district. During his House tenure he chaired several committees, including the Committee on Alcohol Liquor Traffic, the Committee on Irrigation of Arid Lands and the Committee on Irrigation and Reclamation.

Election results

Source: ^ Incumbent when he won seat with new designation in 1918.

After Congress
Smith, age 70, was defeated for re-election in 1932 by Democrat Thomas C. Coffin. In 1934, Smith was appointed to the Board of Veterans Appeals of the Veterans Administration, and served in that capacity until 1942. In 1937 he became director of the Columbia Institution for the Deaf (now Gallaudet University) in Washington, D.C., a position he held until his death.

Smith died at age 93 from lung cancer in 1956 and is buried in Rock Creek Cemetery in Washington, D.C. Addison Avenue, a major east-west thoroughfare in Twin Falls, is named after him.

Notes

External links

Deaths from lung cancer
George Washington University Law School alumni
People from Cambridge, Ohio
People from Twin Falls, Idaho
1862 births
1956 deaths
Deaths from cancer in Washington, D.C.
Burials at Rock Creek Cemetery
Washington, D.C., Republicans
Republican Party members of the United States House of Representatives from Idaho